Guion may refer to:

Guion (name), a given name and surname (including a list of persons with the name)
Guion, Ethiopia
United States:
Guion, Arkansas
Guion, Indiana

See also 
Guion Line, a British passenger ship line
Gwion (disambiguation)